Hiranagar is a town and a notified area committee in Kathua district in the Indian union territory of Jammu and Kashmir. It is a tehsil headquarters. It is named after Rajput Raja Hira Singh, son of Raja Dhyan Singh and nephew of Raja Gulab Singh.

History 
Raja Hira Singh, the nephew of Maharaja Gulab Singh, is believed to have founded the town after his name when he was bestowed with the jagir of Jasrota. He also renovated the Jasmergarh Fort situated between Tarnah and Bein Nallahs. The fort also housed the tehsil and other government offices prior to 1947. Later the offices were moved to Hiranagar.

Geography
It has an average elevation of 308 metres (1010 feet).

Demographics 
Hiranagar Subdivision has total population of 8,294 according to the 2011 Indian Census. Out of which 4,526 are Males while number of Females is 3,768
Average sex ratio of the Subdivision is 833
No. of Families residing in the Subdivision is 1,723
Child Sex Ratio 792'

Religion based Demographics

Jasmergarh Fort 
Jasmergarh Fort is situated just outside the town. Towards the border with Pakistan. It was built by King Hira, after whom the town is named. It has a notable temple of Mata Kali. It is one of the historical places in Kathua District.

Rail and road connectivity
The town of Hiranagar is connected to major cities like- Jammu, Srinagar, New Delhi, etc.. via Srinagar-Kanyakumari Highway(NH-44). Hiranagar has a railway station through which it is connected to other cities with rail connectivity.

References 

Forts in Jammu and Kashmir
Cities and towns in Kathua district